Delta Air Lines Flight 1288 was a regularly scheduled flight from Pensacola, Florida, to Atlanta, Georgia.  On July 6, 1996, the aircraft serving the flight, a McDonnell Douglas MD-88, was on takeoff roll from Runway 17 at Pensacola when it experienced an uncontained, catastrophic turbine engine failure that caused debris from the front compressor hub of the left engine to penetrate the left aft fuselage. The cause of the engine failure was judged to have been a fault in the manufacture of the fan, and failure of the airline to spot the resulting crack in the blade.

The impact left two passengers dead and two severely injured; the two dead were a mother and son. The pilot aborted takeoff and the airplane stopped on the runway. Three other passengers sustained minor injuries during the emergency evacuation. Most of the passengers were traveling on vacation.

Aircraft and crew 
The aircraft involved was an 8-year-old McDonnell Douglas MD-88 registered as  It was built in April 1988 and delivered to Delta in November the same year. The aircraft was equipped with two Pratt & Whitney JT8D-219 turbofan engines. It had 22,031 flight hours and 18,826 take off and landing cycles at the time of the accident.

The 40-year-old captain had been with Delta Air Lines since 1979, having previously flown for a commuter airline. He had 12,000 flight hours, including 2,300 hours on the MD-88. The 37-year-old first officer had been with Delta since 1990, having logged 6,500 flight hours, with 500 on them on the MD-88. The first officer had previously been a United States Air Force pilot.

Pre-flight inspection 
During the pre-flight inspection, the first officer noted a few drops of oil coming from the "bullet" or tip of the number one (left) engine, although it was said to be "not that serious". The first officer also noticed a couple of missing rivets on the left wing. The pilot told National Transportation Safety Board (NTSB) investigators that both problems were observed as non-threatening and that the aircraft was airworthy; therefore, maintenance was not informed.

Takeoff and accident 

At 2:23 pm CDT, Delta flight 1288 was cleared for takeoff on Runway 17. The rear cabin passengers and flight crew heard a very loud bang and experienced a blast-like sensation. The pilot then ended takeoff by bringing the throttle to idle and engaging the brake, which brought the aircraft to an eventual stop without use of reversers or spoilers.

Once the aircraft stopped, the first officer attempted to contact the tower; however, he was unable due to the cockpit's lack of power. The flight crew then activated emergency power, contacted Pensacola tower, and declared an emergency. The cockpit's jump-seat passenger, an off-duty Delta Boeing 767 pilot deadheading with the fellow cockpit crew members, went to inspect the rear of the aircraft. When the first officer saw the over-wing exits open and about half of the passengers missing along with hearing engine noise, he returned to the cockpit and advised the captain to shut down the engines.

At 2:27 pm CDT the pilot requested emergency medical assistance due to the jump-seat passenger's report of a large hole in the fuselage, engine debris throughout the cabin, and injured passengers. He then reported there was no evidence of smoke or fire in the cabin, and that the rear cabin door had been opened and the emergency slide was inflated. The flight attendant who initiated the evacuation through that door told the NTSB that she saw fire on the left engine and therefore abandoned evacuation through that door and directed passengers forward. She reported that there were many injuries and possibly two dead, and that therefore she began to evacuate the plane until she was stopped by the first officer. Due to the damage to and danger at the rear of the aircraft, the air stairs built into the MD-88 were found unsuitable to use. The captain then requested portable air stairs to facilitate the disembarkation of passengers, which arrived 25 minutes later.

Injuries and deaths 

Two passengers suffered fatal injuries. Five more passengers were injured; one of them was noted to be in serious condition.

NTSB investigation 

After a total investigation, the NTSB determined the most probable cause of the accident was a fracture in the left engine's front compressor fan hub, which resulted from failure of the airline's fluorescent penetrant inspection process to detect a potentially dangerous crack in the fan which originated from the engine's initial manufacture. The NTSB also attributed the accident to the failure of Delta's maintenance team to discover the problem.

Aftermath
As of April 2018, the FAA reports the aircraft involved in the accident was repaired and returned to service with Delta under the same registration  The aircraft was withdrawn from use by Delta on August 10, 2018.

See also
Delta Air Lines Flight 1086 – An accident that happened in 2015, involving another McDonnell Douglas MD-88, without fatalities
Southwest Airlines Flight 1380 – A similar accident that happened in 2018, with one fatality
Southwest Airlines Flight 3472 – A similar accident that happened in 2016, without fatalities
British Airtours Flight 28M, a Boeing 737 that abandoned their takeoff from Manchester Airport after a combustor exploded in the left engine, killing 55.

References

External links 
NTSB investigation docket

Airliner accidents and incidents in Florida
Aviation accidents and incidents in 1996
1288
Accidents and incidents involving the McDonnell Douglas MD-88
Escambia County, Florida
1996 in Florida
Aviation accidents and incidents in the United States in 1996
July 1996 events in the United States
Airliner accidents and incidents involving uncontained engine failure